K2-19 is an early K-type or late G-type main sequence star that is magnetically active, and has a light curve that exhibits variations in brightness of ~1%. It is located approximately 976 light-years away in the constellation Virgo. Three confirmed transiting exoplanets are known to orbit this star.

Planetary system

Discovery
The two outer planets were reported as planet candidates during analysis of data from Campaign 1 of the Kepler spacecraft K2 extended mission. Both planets were confirmed by David J. Armstrong and collaborators, who used ground-based telescopes to detect additional transits and measure hour-long transit-timing variations for K2-19b. They were independently validated along with 20 other planets by Benjamin T. Montet and team.

K2-19d was first reported as a planet candidate during a search for candidates from the first year of the K2 Mission and was later validated by Sinukoff et al.

Characteristics
K2-19 has a planetary system with three known planets, of which the two larger ones, K2-19b and K2-19c, are close to the 3:2 mean motion resonance. All three planets orbit closer to their star than the planet Mercury does to the Sun.

References

K-type main-sequence stars
Planetary systems with three confirmed planets
Planetary transit variables
Virgo (constellation)